BLM LLP was an insurance and dispute resolution law firm based in the United Kingdom and Ireland. It was rebranded from Berrymans Lace Mawer following the merger with HBM Sayers in May 2014.

BLM provided legal services in 50 areas of law, grouped into eleven key market sectors: brokers, construction and property, general insurance, healthcare, leisure and hospitality, Lloyds and London market, manufacturing, public sector, retail, TMT and transport and logistics.

BLM has 13 offices across the UK and Ireland. The firm has approximately 1,550 staff including 170 partners (as of 1 May 2014) and 630 lawyers and technical experts.

As of 1 July 2022, BLM completed its merger with global firm Clyde & Co.

History

In 1997, the firm was created with the merger of Berrymans with Lace Mawer. The origins of the firm date back to the 18th century, when Joshua Lace gave his name to an already established law firm in Liverpool. In 1901, Frederic Berryman began the practice of Berrymans in the City of London and, in 1946, Arthur Mawer founded AW Mawer & Co in Manchester. On 1 May 2014, Berrymans Lace Mawer and HBM Sayers formally combined as BLM.

Matthew Harrington is the current national senior partner (elected February 2018) succeeding Mike Brown's six-year term. In October 2017, BLM launched a new commercial advisory practice bringing in a new team of 33 lawyers, including 11 partners from the law firm, Slater & Gordon.

As of March 2022 BLM have agreed to merge with Clyde & Co

References

External links
 

Law firms of the United Kingdom
Law firms established in 1997
1997 establishments in the United Kingdom